Bellaspira is a genus of sea snails, marine gastropod mollusks in the family Drilliidae.

Description
(Original description) The shell is subfusiform and is longitudinally ribbed. The siphonal canal is very short. The simple outer lip is obsoletely, widely notched and curved outwards. The lip is reflexed and entire. The columella is straight.

Distribution
The species in this genus are found in the Caribbean Sea and in the western Atlantic Ocean.

Species
Species within the genus Bellaspira include:
 Bellaspira acclivicosta McLean & L. Poorman, 1970
 Bellaspira amplicostata Fallon, 2016
 Bellaspira aurantiaca Fallon, 2016
 Bellaspira barbadensis Fallon, 2016
 Bellaspira clarionensis McLean & L. Poorman, 1970
 Bellaspira grippi (Dall, 1908)
 Bellaspira hannyae (De Jong & Coomans, 1988)
 Bellaspira margaritensis McLean & L. Poorman, 1970
 Bellaspira melea Dall, 1919
 Bellaspira minutissima Fallon, 2016
 Bellaspira pentagonalis (Dall, 1889)
 Bellaspira rosea Fallon, 2016
 Bellaspira stahlschmidti Fallon, 2016
 Bellaspira tricolor Fallon, 2016
 † Bellaspira virginiana (Conrad, 1862) 
Species brought into synonymy
 Bellaspira brunnescens (Rehder, 1943): synonym of Fenimorea moseri (Dall, 1889)
 Bellaspira grimaldii (Dautzenberg, 1889): synonym of  Amphissa acutecostata (Philippi, 1844)
 Bellaspira pentapleura Schwengel, 1940: synonym of Bellaspira pentagonalis (Dall, 1889)
 Bellaspira rigida (Reeve, 1846): synonym of Haedropleura septangularis (Montagu, 1803)
 Bellaspira rufa (Montagu, 1803): synonym of  Propebela rufa (Montagu, 1803)
 Bellaspira septangularis (Montagu, 1803)  synonym of  Haedropleura septangularis (Montagu, 1803)

References

 Bartsch, Paul, and Harald A. Rehder. "New turritid mollusks from Florida." Proceedings of the United States National Museum (1939).
 McLean, James H., and Leroy H. Poorman. Reinstatement of the turrid genus Bellaspira Conrad, 1868 (Mollusca: Gastropoda) with a review of the known species. Los Angeles County Museum of Natural History, 1970

External links
 WMSDB - Worldwide Mollusc Species Data Base: family Drilliidae

 
Drilliidae